Kim Jong-pil ((born 11 March 1955) is a South Korean former football defender. He currently manager of FC Chungju.

He played for Korea Development Bank FC and Saehan Motors / Daewoo FC.

Managerial career
In July 2013, he was appointed as manager of Chungju Hummel FC. In November 2016, he was appointed as manager of FC Anyang.

In 2023, Jong-pil announcement officially manager of FC Chungju, previously he had coached the Chungju Citizen FC club but eventually the club disbanded in 2022.

References

External links

South Korean footballers
1955 births
Living people
Chungju Hummel FC managers
FC Anyang managers
Association football defenders
South Korean football managers